Carex raynoldsii is a species of sedge known by the common name Raynolds' sedge. It is native to western North America and grows in alpine to subalpine meadows.

Description
Carex raynoldsii is sedge produces clumps of smooth stems up to about 75 centimeters in maximum height from a network of rhizomes. The inflorescence is a cluster of separate rounded or oval flower spikes one to two centimeters long, each generally hanging on a peduncle. The female flower has a covering scale which is black, brown, or purple, often with a raised, light colored midstripe and produces a rounded fruit.

Distribution and habitat
This sedge is native to western North America from California to Colorado to Yukon, where it grows in mountain meadows in subalpine and alpine climates.

References

External links
Jepson Manual Treatment - Carex raynoldsii
USDA Plants Profile: Carex raynoldsii
Carex raynoldsii - Photo gallery

raynoldsii
Alpine flora
Flora of the Western United States
Flora of Western Canada
Flora of Alaska
Flora of California
Flora of the Sierra Nevada (United States)
Plants described in 1861
Flora without expected TNC conservation status